Iceberg is an adventure novel by Clive Cussler published in the United States by Dodd, Mead & Company in 1975.  This is the 3rd published book to feature the author's primary protagonist Dirk Pitt.

Plot introduction
Dirk Pitt is summoned from his vacation on the sunny beaches of California and sent to the Arctic when an iceberg is discovered that contains the remains of a missing luxury yacht.  The yacht was on its way to a top-secret meeting with the White House; now the entire crew is dead, incinerated at their posts.  This discovery sets Pitt on a deadly adventure as he tries to stop a multi-millionaire madman from upsetting the balance of world power and possibly causing the collapse of the world's economy.

Plot summary

While on a routine survey mission of the iceberg fields in the North Atlantic, a United States Coast Guard survey plane discovers what appears to be a ship embedded in an iceberg.  The plane marks the iceberg with a red dye marker and then returns to its base to report the discovery.

Admiral Sandecker dispatches Dirk Pitt and Dr. Bill Hunnewell of the National Underwater and Marine Agency on a top-secret mission to survey the ship in the iceberg.  Pitt concocts an outlandish story about a disappeared Russian spy trawler, supposedly equipped with their latest in technology and codes, in order to commandeer the Coast Guard cutter USCGC Catawaba as a base of operations.  In reality they are searching for the yacht Lax, which disappeared mysteriously over a year ago with its billionaire owner, Kristjan Fyrie, and its entire crew while on their way to the United States.

When Dirk and the doctor search for the iceberg, they discover that someone has gone to a great deal of effort to erase the dye marker and try to convince them that the iceberg they are looking for is somewhere else by marking a similar iceberg 90 miles to the east.  Pitt quickly figures out the trick and they eventually find the correct iceberg and work their way into the derelict ship.  Inside they discover that all those on board have been incinerated at their posts by a terrible fire much more severe than should have been possible on a ship of that type.

It is revealed that Fyrie has developed a new type of underwater probe using a laboratory created element called Celtinium-279.  Using this new probe it is possible to scan the ocean floor from the surface and detect minerals and metals without having to drill.  The probe is of enormous value.  Unfortunately for the crew the Celtinium-279 proves to be extremely unstable and it ignites causing an incredibly destructive fire, the heat from which eventually allowed the ship to become embedded in the iceberg.

After their work on the iceberg is done Pitt and Dr. Hunnewell continue on their trip by helicopter from the Coast Guard cutter toward Reykjavík, Iceland.  They are intercepted along the way by a black Lorelei Mark VIII jet and engage in a frantic battle.  Pitt earns a pyrrhic victory over the jet causing it to crash by ramming into it with his helicopter which naturally caused it to crash as well.  Dr. Hunnewell is severely injured in the crash and dies in Pitt's arms while uttering the cryptic last words "God save thee..." which it is later revealed are lines from the Rime of the Ancient Mariner intended to give Pitt clues as to who is responsible for Hunnewell's death.

After recovering from his injuries, Pitt is assigned by Admiral Sandecker to get close to Kirsti Fyrie, long-lost sister of Kristjan who is now in charge of his companies.  Kirsti's fiancé Oskar Rondheim is a ruthless businessman who appears to be intimidating Fyrie into marrying him in order to take control of her businesses.  It is later revealed that Rondheim is actually Carzo Butera, a wanted mobster with many aliases; Rondheim/Butera learned that Kristjan Fyrie underwent secret sex reassignment surgery to become Kirsti, and is using this information to blackmail her and gain control over her empire.

Pitt uncovers a shadowy organization known as Hermit Limited, conceived and funded by American billionaire F. James Kelly.  The group's goal is to obtain control over Central and South America by secretly buying up all of the major industries in these relatively weak countries. The group intends to employ the domino theory by taking over two countries and turning them into such huge successes that the other countries in the region clamor to join.  In order to distract the world during the takeover, Hermit Limited conceived a further plot to kidnap five millionaires and other important people from various countries and fake an air disaster in an uninhabited area of Iceland.  While there is an international furor in the press over the disappearance of and eventual discovery of the bodies of the missing people, Hermit Limited will quietly assassinate the leaders of the two countries and assume control.

The leaders of the two countries targeted by Hermit Limited, Pablo Castille of the Dominican Republic and Juan De Croix of French Guiana, were in the United States attending a conference in San Francisco for the Alliance of Economic and Agricultural Products.  On their way home they stopped to do some sightseeing at Disneyland where Hermit Limited will attempt to assassinate them.

Dirk Pitt, who has been stranded with the group of abducted millionaires, manages to escape and make his way to civilization.  He commandeers an old Ford tri-motor airplane and rescues the others, who have been left at the mercy of the elements.  Barely out of the hospital following this harrowing rescue, Pitt is rushed to Disneyland where he (in guise as the Big Bad Wolf) attempts to save Castille and de Croix, who have slipped away from their security and are enjoying the Pirates of the Caribbean ride; he succeeds in foiling Rondheim (disguised as part of the display) with a prop cutlass, breaks Rondheim's legs and arms and turns him over to FBI for trial and execution.

Characters
Sergeant Sam Cashman - United States Air Force mechanic who also moonlights as a mechanic for civilian aircraft.  Cashman is also the only one on Iceland qualified to fly the Ford tri-motor used for the rescue attempt.
Pablo Castile - President of the Dominican Republic.
Juan De Croix - Leader of the People's Progressive Party new president of French Guiana.
Roger Dupuy - French millionaire whose disappearance, along with a group of others, is intended to distract the world from Hermit Limited's plot.
Kirsti Fyrie - Introduced as the twin sister to Kristjan Fyrie who until recently had been a missionary in New Guinea.  She is in fact Kristjan Fyrie who underwent sex reassignment surgery.
Kristjan Fyrie - Described as a genius, adventurer, scientist, legend, and the 10th richest man in the world before he was 25.  A native of Reykjavík, Iceland he made his fortune mining diamonds from the seafloor off the shores of Africa.   Following his success with diamonds continued to amass wealth by mining manganese and exploring for oil on the ocean floor.  Fyrie disappeared along with the entire crew out of his yacht while sailing to United States and is believed dead.
Hans von Hummel - German millionaire and member of Hermit Limited .
Dr. Bill Hunnewell  - Director of the California Institute of Oceanography affiliated with The National Underwater and Marine Agency.  Dr. Hunnewell is the co-inventor of the top-secret, groundbreaking undersea mineral probe and a key member of Hermit Limited.
Dr. Jonsson - An Icelandic doctor who treated Pitt after his helicopter crash and helped him escape from the imposter policeman who came to kill him by Hermit Limited.
F. James Kelly - American billionaire and philanthropist who conceived of the plot to take over South and Central America in an effort to create a modern Utopia and calls together a group of like-minded fellow millionaires and billionaires and forms Hermit Limited.
Sam Kelly - brother of James sacrificed in order to make the event of the deaths of the others appear more realistic.
Dean Kippmann - Chief of the National Intelligence Agency.
Lt. Commander Lee Koski - Captain of the Coast Guard Cutter Catawaba which Dirk Pitt commandeers to aid in his search for the vessel in the iceberg.
Jerome P. Lillie IV - Undercover agent of the National Intelligence Agency who is acting as Dirk's contact while he's in Iceland.
Dan Lazard - Head of Disneyland security.
Ibian Mahani - Iranian millionaire who along with a group of others is adducted as part of the plan to distract the world while Hermit Limited conducts its plot.
Sir Eric Marks - British billionaire and member of Hermit Limited.
Major Dirk Pitt - Special Projects Director for the National Underwater and Marine Agency.
Oskar Rondheim - Introduced as the fiancée of Kirsti Fyrie, he owns an international chain of canneries, Rondheim Industries.  Rondheim's fleet of blue fishing boats flies a red flag with an albatross, his personal symbol, and are notorious for wiping out fishing grounds by over-fishing them almost to the verge of extinction, robbing the nets of other fishermen, and fishing in the territorial boundaries of other countries.  It is later revealed that he is in actuality Carzo Butera, a well-known criminal with several aliases who is not motivated by the need to create a utopia but rather by the need to amass power.  As the head of Hermit Limited's assassination department he has the means to exert his control over the rest of the group.
Tidi Royal - Private Secretary to Admiral James Sandecker.  Tidi is a very attractive woman who is more than a little attracted to Dirk but to Pitt she is strictly off limits as he has too much respect for the Admiral to dally with his secretary, much to her disappointment.
Admiral James Sandecker - Chief Director of The National Underwater and Marine Agency
Comrade Tamarectov - Russian diplomat kidnapped as part of the distraction plot by Hermit Limited.
Dr. Jesus Ybarra - The surgeon who performed the sex reassignment surgery on Kristjan Fyrie and is also a member of Hermit Limited.

Trivia
The author noted that when he was asked which is his favorite Dirk Pitt book, his sentimental choice was Iceberg.  He chose this book because it represented a transition from the simpler storylines of Pacific Vortex and The Mediterranean Caper to a plot involving a cast of more than 20 characters with a more convoluted plot.
 This is the only book in the series that does not have Dirk Pitt's trusty right-hand man Al Giordino. The author stated that he is not entirely sure now why he left Al out, but to date it has never happened again in the series.
 Pitt is said to be 32 years old in the novel. However, in Arctic Drift, set over 30 years later, his age is only 55.

Release details
1975, United States, Dodd Mead & Company, September 1975, Hardcover.
1977, United States, Bantam, 1977, Paperback.
1984, United States, Bantam (mass market paperback), 1984, Paperback.
1995, United States, Pocket Books (reissue edition), January 1995, Paperback.
1996, United States, Simon & Schuster (reissue edition), 1996,

References

1976 American novels
Dirk Pitt novels
Novels set in the Arctic
Dodd, Mead & Co. books
Novels with transgender themes